Dan River Inc. Riverside Division Historic District and Dan River Mill No. 8 is a national historic district located at Danville, Virginia. The district includes 23 contributing buildings and 13 contributing structures in the city of Danville.  The district includes buildings and structures associated with the Riverside Division, one of two historic textile mill complexes in Danville developed by Dan River Inc. and its predecessor, Riverside Cotton Mills.  The building and structures  are characterized by multistory industrial buildings of mostly brick construction dating from the 1880s through the 1910s.  Dan River Mill No. 8 is a four-story, reinforced concrete building constructed in the 1920s.

It was listed on the National Register of Historic Places in 2000, with a boundary increase in 2010.  It was delisted in 2016.

The Riverside Division of the company, site of the former Riverside Cotton Mills was constructed by its long time president and founder T.B. Fitzgerald.

References

Industrial buildings and structures on the National Register of Historic Places in Virginia
National Register of Historic Places in Danville, Virginia
Historic districts on the National Register of Historic Places in Virginia
Buildings and structures in Danville, Virginia
Cotton mills in the United States
Former National Register of Historic Places in Virginia